Robert Banks Davidson (born January 6, 1963) is a former Major League Baseball pitcher who played for the New York Yankees in .

Biography
A native of Bad Kreuznach, West Germany, Davidson attended East Carolina University. In 1983, he played collegiate summer baseball with the Hyannis Mets of the Cape Cod Baseball League. Davidson was drafted by the New York Yankees in the 24th round of the 1984 MLB Draft.

In one career MLB game with New York, he had a 0–0 record with an 18.00 ERA. On July 15, 1989, he worked one inning, giving up a two-run home run to Baseball Hall of Famer George Brett.

References

External links
Baseball Reference.com page

1963 births
Living people
New York Yankees players
Oneonta Yankees players
Hyannis Harbor Hawks players
Major League Baseball pitchers
Major League Baseball players from Germany
Albany-Colonie Yankees players
Columbus Clippers players
East Carolina Pirates baseball players
Fort Lauderdale Yankees players
Louisville Redbirds players
Prince William Yankees players
People from Bad Kreuznach
Sportspeople from Rhineland-Palatinate